Pratylenchidae is a family of plant pathogenic nematodes.

Members include Achlysiella williamsi.

References 

Tylenchida
Nematode families
Taxa described in 1949